Essiama is a town near Axim in the Nzema East Municipal District, a district in the Western Region of Ghana.

Beaches
Essiama has some of the best beaches in Ghana which serves as a source of entertainment for incoming tourists and a means of livelihood for local People.

References

Populated places in the Western Region (Ghana)